The 2017–18 Tulane Green Wave women's basketball team will represent Tulane University during the 2017–18 NCAA Division I women's basketball season. The Green Wave, led by twenty-fourth year head coach Lisa Stockton, play their home games at Devlin Fieldhouse and were fourth year members of the American Athletic Conference. They finished the season 14–17, 5–1 in AAC play to finish in a for eighth place. They defeat Memphis in the first round before losing in the quarterfinals of the American Athletic women's tournament to Connecticut.

Media
All Green Wave games will be broadcast on WRBH 88.3 FM. A video stream for all home games will be on Tulane All-Access, ESPN3, or AAC Digital. Road games will typically be streamed on the opponents website, though conference road games could also appear on ESPN3 or AAC Digital.

Roster

Schedule and results

|-
! colspan="9" style="background:#00331a; color:skyBlue;"| Exhibition

|-
! colspan="9" style="background:#00331a; color:skyBlue;"| Non-conference regular season

|-
! colspan="9" style="background:#00331a; color:skyBlue;"| AAC regular season

|-
!colspan=12 style="background:#004731;"| AAC Women's Tournament

Rankings

See also
 2017–18 Tulane Green Wave men's basketball team

References

Tulane
Tulane Green Wave women's basketball seasons
Tulane
Tulane